Squalius laietanus is a species of ray-finned fish in the family Cyprinidae. It is found in Ebro and Llobregat drainages in Spain, and Tech and Agly drainages in France.

References

Squalius
Fish described in 2007